The 2017 FIA World Rally Championship-3 was the fifth season of the World Rally Championship-3, an auto racing championship recognised by the Fédération Internationale de l'Automobile, running in support of the World Rally Championship. It was created when the Group R class of rally car was introduced in 2013.

Drivers and teams had to nominate a maximum of seven events, the best six results counted towards the championship.

Simone Tempestini did not return to defend the 
2016 title as he competed in the 2017 World Rally Championship-2. Nil Solans won the title with a Ford Fiesta R2T.

Calendar

Teams and drivers

Season report

The season started with the Rallye Monte Carlo. In the category, there were six entries, including four by Renault Sport. The rally was won from start to end by Raphaël Astier, winning by more than nine minutes over the rest of the crews. The podium was completed by Renault's Luca Panzani and Charles Martin.

Louise Cook was the sole entrant for Rally Sweden in the category. She had to retire after losing the bumper of her car before the Colin's Crest jump during the second pass over the Vargåsen stage. She was able to re-assemble the car, but an homologation problem in the spare seat brackets, made her unable to start the final leg of the rally, leaving the category with no winner.

After there were no entries in Rally Mexico, the action continued Tour de Corse, which also featured the first round of the Junior championship. Raphaël Astier lead the event from start to finish, winning the event by almost a minute and a half from Junior entrant Nil Solans. The podium was completed by local Nicolas Ciamin, who claimed to that position after a driveshaft problem prevented fellow Frenchman Terry Folb the means to finish in the podium.

Results and standings

Season summary

FIA World Rally Championship-3 for Drivers

Points are awarded to the top ten classified finishers.

FIA World Rally Championship-3 for Co-Drivers

FIA World Rally Championship-3 for Teams

Notes

References

External links
Official website of the World Rally Championship
Official website of the Fédération Internationale de l'Automobile

 
World Rally Championship-3